Congenital muscular dystrophies are autosomal recessively-inherited muscle diseases. They are a group of heterogeneous disorders characterized by muscle weakness which is present at birth and the different changes on muscle biopsy that ranges from myopathic to overtly dystrophic due to the age at which the biopsy takes place.

Signs and symptoms 

Most infants with CMD will display some progressive muscle weakness or muscle wasting (atrophy), although there can be different degrees and symptoms of severeness of progression. The weakness is indicated as hypotonia, or lack of muscle tone, which can make an infant seem unstable.

Children may be slow with their motor skills; such as rolling over, sitting up or walking, or may not even reach these milestones of life. Some of the rarer forms of CMD can result in significant learning disabilities.

Genetics
Congenital muscular dystrophies (CMDs) are autosomal recessively inherited, except in some cases of de novo gene mutation and Ullrich congenital muscular dystrophy. This means that in most cases, both parents must be carriers of a CMD gene in order for it to be inherited. CMDs are heterogenous and thus  far there have been 35 genes discovered to be involved with different forms of CMD resulting from these mutations. There are different forms of CMD, often categorized by the protein changes caused by an atypical gene.

One group of forms is that for which a patient with affected genes displays defects in genes necessary to the function of the extracellular matrix. One such form is merosin-deficient congenital muscular dystrophy (MDC1A), which accounts for around one-third of all CMD cases and is caused by mutations in the LAMA2 gene on the 6q2 chromosome,  encoding for the laminin-α2 chain. Laminin-α2 is an essential part of proteins like Laminin-2 and Laminin-4 that have important functions in muscle movement, and most patients with a mutated LAMA2 gene have no expression of Laminin-α2 in muscle tissue. Another form in this group is Ullrich congenital muscular dystrophy, which is caused by mutations in the COL6A1, COL6A2 and COL6A3 genes that encode for three of the alpha chains making up Collagen VI. Collagen VI is important in muscle, tendon, and skin tissue, and functions to attach cells to the extracellular matrix. Ullrich CMD can be caused by both autosomal recessive or autosomal dominant mutations, although dominant mutations are usually de novo. Recessive mutations often lead to a complete absence of Collagen VI in the extracellular matrix, while there are different types of dominant mutations that can cause partial function of Collagen V1.

Another form of CMD is Rigid Spine Congenital Muscular Dystrophy (RSMD1), or Rigid Spine Syndrome, which is caused by mutations in the SEPN1 gene encoding for selenoprotein N. The exact function of selenoprotein N is unknown, but it is expressed in the rough endoplasmic reticulum of skeletal muscle, heart, brain, lung, and placenta tissues, as well as at high levels in the diaphragm. RSMD1 is characterized by axial and respiratory weakness, spinal rigidity and scoliosis, and muscular atrophy, and while it is a rare form of CMD, SEPN1 mutations are observed in other congenital myopathies.

Some of the most common forms of CMDs are dystroglycanopathies caused by glycosylation defects of α-dystroglycan (α-DG), which helps link the extracellular matrix and the cytoskeleton.  Dystroglycanopathies are caused by mutations in genes encoding for proteins involved in modifying α-DG after translation of the protein, not mutations in the protein itself. 19 genes have been discovered that cause α-DG-related dystrophies, with a wide range of phenotypic effects observed, characterized by brain malformations along with muscular dystrophy. Walker-Warburg syndrome (WWS) is the most severe dystroglycanopathy phenotype, with the POMT1 gene as the first reported causative gene, although there have been 11 additional genes implicated in WWS. These genes include POMT2, FKRP, FKTN, ISPD, CTDC2, TMEM5, POMGnT1, B3GALnT2, GMPPB, B3GnT1, and SGK196, many of which have been identified as involved in other dystroglycanopathies. Patients display muscle weakness and cerebellar and ocular malformations, with a life expectancy of less than 1 year.

An additional dystroglycanopathy phenotype is Fukuyama congenital muscular dystrophy (FCMD) caused by a mutation in the Fukutin (FKTN) gene, which is the second most common type of muscular dystrophy in Japan after Duchenne muscular dystrophy. The founder mutation of FCMD is a 3- kilo base pair retrotransposon insertion in the noncoding region of FKTN, leading to muscle weakness, abnormal eye function, seizures, and intellectual disability. While the exact function of FKTN is unknown, FKTN mRNA is expressed in fetuses in the developing CNS, muscles, and eyes, and is likely necessary for normal development since complete inactivation leads to embryonic death at 7 days. Another phenotype, Muscle-eye-brain disease (MEB) is the dystroglycanopathy most prevalent in Finland, and is caused by mutations in the POMGnT1, FKRP, FKTN, ISPD, and TMEM5 genes.  The POMGnT1 gene is expressed in the same tissues as FKTN, and MEB appears to have a similar severity as FCMD. However, symptoms unique to MEB include glaucoma, atrophy of the optic nerves, and retinal generation. The least severe phenotype of dystroglycanopathies is CMD type 1c (MDC1C), caused by mutations in the FKRP and the LARGE gene, with a phenotype similar to MEB and WWS. MDC1C also includes Limb-Girdle muscular dystrophy.

Mechanism
In terms of the mechanism of congenital muscular dystrophy, one finds that though there are many types of CMD the glycosylation of α-dystroglycan and alterations in those genes that are involved are an important part of this conditions pathophysiology

Diagnosis

For the diagnosis of congenital muscular dystrophy, the following tests/exams are done:
 Lab study (CK levels)
 Muscle MRI and especially whole body muscle MRI has recently been used to describe muscle abnormalities in patients with primary laminin-α2 (merosin) deficiency subtype of CMD.  
 EMG
 Genetic testing

(different types of congenital muscular dystrophies) 
The subtypes of congenital muscular dystrophy have been established through variations in multiple genes. Phenotype, as well as, genotype classifications are used to establish the subtypes, in some literature.

One finds that congenital muscular dystrophies can be either autosomal dominant or autosomal recessive in terms of the inheritance pattern, though the latter is much more common

Individuals with congenital muscular dystrophy fall into one of the following types:

Differential diagnosis
The DDx of congenital muscular dystrophy, in an affected individual, is as follows (non-neuromuscular genetic conditions also exist):
 Metabolic myopathies
 Dystrophinopathies
 Emery-Dreifuss muscular dystrophy

Management

In terms of the management of congenital muscular dystrophy the American Academy of Neurology recommends that the individuals
need to have monitoring of cardiac function, respiratory, and gastrointestinal. Additionally it is believed that therapy in speech, orthopedic and physical areas, would improve the person's quality of life.

While there is currently no cure available, it is important to preserve muscle activity and any available correction of skeletal abnormalities (as scoliosis). Orthopedic procedures, like spinal fusion, maintains/increases the individual's prospect for more physical movement.

See also 
 Muscular dystrophies
 Ullrich Congenital Muscular Dystrophy
 Fukuyama Congenital Muscular Dystrophy

References

Further reading

External links 
 PubMed

Muscular dystrophy